Balaenella is an extinct genus of balaenid from the early Pliocene of the vicinity of Antwerp, Belgium. Its type species is Balaena brachyrhynchus.

Classification
A cladistic analysis of Balaenidae places Balaenella as the sister taxon of the bowhead whale in a clade separate from right whales.

References

Balaenidae
Fossil taxa described in 2005
Pliocene mammals of Europe
Baleen whales
Pliocene cetaceans
Prehistoric cetacean genera